Late Knight Special is the debut album by American rapper and record producer Kirk Knight. It was released on October 30, 2015, by Cinematic Music Group.

Background
The album features guest appearances by fellow Pro Era member Joey Bada$$, as well as The Mind, Mick Jenkins, Noname and Thundercat. The album is solely produced by Kirk Knight, alongside THEMpeople, with bass arrangement by Thundercat. The project debuts at number 33 on the Top R&B/Hip-Hop Albums chart and number 10 at Billboard's Heatseekers Albums.

Critical reception

The album received mostly positive reviews, with HipHopDX calling the album "a sonic oeuvre of contemporary East Coast Hip Hop rooted in tradition, yet stunningly present." HipHopDX rated it the best R&B/Hip Hop album of October, giving it a 4.5/5 rating.

Track listing 

Notes
"Heaven Is for Real" features uncredited vocals from T'nah Apex.

References

2015 debut albums
Kirk Knight albums
Cinematic Music Group albums
Pro Era albums
Albums produced by Kirk Knight
Albums produced by Thundercat (musician)